Progress 9 was a Soviet unmanned Progress cargo spacecraft, which was launched in April 1980 to resupply the Salyut 6 space station.

Spacecraft
Progress 9 was a Progress 7K-TG spacecraft. The ninth of forty three to be launched, it had the serial number 109. The Progress 7K-TG spacecraft was the first generation Progress, derived from the Soyuz 7K-T and intended for uncrewed logistics missions to space stations in support of the Salyut programme. On some missions the spacecraft were also used to adjust the orbit of the space station.

The spacecraft were powered by chemical batteries, and could operate in free flight for up to three days, remaining docked to the station for up to thirty.

Launch
Progress 9 launched on 27 April 1980 from the Baikonur Cosmodrome in the Kazakh SSR. It used a Soyuz-U rocket.

Docking
Progress 9 docked with the aft port of Salyut 6 on 29 April 1980 at 08:09:19 UTC, and was undocked on 20 May 1980 at 18:51 UTC.

Decay
It remained in orbit until 22 May 1980, when it was deorbited. The deorbit burn occurred at 00:44 UTC and the mission ended at 01:30 UTC.

See also

 1980 in spaceflight
 List of Progress missions
 List of uncrewed spaceflights to Salyut space stations

References

Progress (spacecraft) missions
1980 in the Soviet Union
Spacecraft launched in 1980
Spacecraft which reentered in 1980
Spacecraft launched by Soyuz-U rockets